Jaroslav Pekař (born 13 October 1944) is a Czech sports shooter. He competed in the mixed 50 metre rifle three positions event at the 1980 Summer Olympics.

References

1944 births
Living people
Czech male sport shooters
Olympic shooters of Czechoslovakia
Shooters at the 1980 Summer Olympics
Sportspeople from České Budějovice